Nooriabad (Urdu: 
) is an industrial town in Jamshoro District of Sindh, Pakistan. It is located 94 kilometres from Karachi on the N-5 National Highway
It is part of Sindh Industrial and Trading Estate. There are more than 200 production plants which produce Cotton, Rice, Oil etc.

Factories located here
 LIBERTY MILLS LIMITED
 Yunus Textile Mills
 Lucky Cement
 Power Cement
 Sapphire Textile
 National Foods Limited
 Service Industries Limited
 Latif Textile Mills
 Khas Textile Mills
 Zehra Textile Mills
 Khas Textile Mills
 Noori Textile Mills
 Faisal Textile Mills
 Al Rahim Textile Mills
 ANOOD TEXTILE MILLS
 TERRY WORLD TEXTILE MILLS
 LUCKY COTTON MILLS
 METCO TEXTILE MILLS
 STALION TEXTILE MILLS
 POPULAR JUICE FACTORY
 POPULAR TEXTILE MILLS
 NADEEM TEXTILE MILLS
 SOORTI TEXTILE MILLS
 AL MUQEET TEXTILE MILLS
 Best Board Industries

Weather
Temperature is not much hot in Summer, and remains usually between 30°C to 45°C, and cool winds blow due to near sea side and fresh breeze from the sea side. Rainfall is near normal depending on weather patterns all the year around. In winter, the temperature is between 06°C to 28°C, not too cold in day time however in night time it is cool. The Winter months are from December to February..

See also
 Jhimpir
 Thana Bula Khan
 Thana Ahmed Khan

References

Populated places in Jamshoro District